Coronavirus in Taiwan may refer to:
2002–2004 SARS outbreak, coronavirus outbreak which affected Taiwan in 2003
COVID-19 pandemic in Taiwan, coronavirus outbreak which affected Taiwan from 2020